Motuketekete Island is an uninhabited island in the northern Hauraki Gulf, off the northeastern coast of New Zealand's North Island. It is separated from Moturekareka Island to the west by the Blanche Channel.

History 
The island was purchased by John Long Haydon, along with nearby Moturekareka, and Motuora in March 1845 from Ngāti Pāoa chief Te Ruinga and members of Ngāti Rongo. A copper mine was established on the island, similar to the copper mines found on nearby Kawau Island. However, by 1847 the mine had failed due to flooding. The New Zealand Land Commission ruled in 1848 that Motuketekete was a part of the Mahurangi and Omaha Purchase, and compensated Haydon for the purchase. Scottish sheep farmer Charlie P. Hansen purchased Moturekareka, Motutara, Kohatutara and Motuketekete in the early 1920s, living on Motuketekete until the late 1920s.

Geography 

Environment 
Feral guinea pigs lived on the island in the mid-20th century, but these had been wiped out by 1982.

References

Islands of the Auckland Region
Uninhabited islands of New Zealand